Stefano Scaini (born 4 May 1983) is a former Italian male long-distance runner who competed at three editions of the IAAF World Cross Country Championships at senior level (2003, 2005, 2006). He is the husband of the marathon runner Anna Incerti.

National titles
 Italian Athletics Championships
 10 km road: 2011

References

External links
 

1983 births
Living people
Italian male long-distance runners
Italian male mountain runners
21st-century Italian people